Cordierites is a genus of fungi in the family Cordieritidaceae. 

The genus name of Cordierites is in honour of François Simon Cordier (1797-1874), a French Military doctor and botanist (Mycology), he was a founder member and president of the Société botanique de France in 1872.

The genus was circumscribed by Jean Pierre François Camille Montagne in Ann. Sci. Nat. Bot. ser. 2, Vol.14 on page 330 in 1840.

Species
The following species are recognised in the genus Cordierites:
Cordierites acanthophorus 
Cordierites boedijnii 
Cordierites coralloides Berk. & M.A. Curtis (1869)
Cordierites fasciculata Möller (1901)
Cordierites guyanensis 
Cordierites muscoides Berk. & M.A. Curtis (1875)
Cordierites umbilicarioides

References

Leotiomycetes
Leotiomycetes genera
Taxa described in 1840
Taxa named by Camille Montagne